Triglochin palustris or marsh arrowgrass is a species of flowering plant in the arrowgrass family Juncaginaceae. It is found in damp grassland usually on calcareous soils, fens and meadows. The species epithet palustris is Latin for "of the marsh" and indicates its common habitat. It has a circumboreal distribution, occurring throughout northern parts of the Northern Hemisphere. It can be found locally in the British Isles especially the north.

Description

It is a slender perennial herb 15 to 40 cm tall.  It has no stolons, and emits a pleasant aromatic  smell when bruised.

The leaves are linear, 10 to 20 cm long, rounded on the lower side, deeply grooved on the other.

It has many 3 petaled flowers arranged in a long spike, with purple edged perianth segments, 2 mm long. It flowers from June until August.

The fruits are club shaped, 10 mm long and 2 mm wide. These plants can adapt to animals attacking it by closing its self in.

Similar species
Triglochin maritimum (sea arrowgrass) is similar but has the following differences: it has stolons, is stouter.  The leaves are fleshy and not furrowed above.  It is not very aromatic.  The raceme are more dense and like Sea Plantain.  The flowers are fleshier.  The fruits are oval, 4 mm long, 2 mm wide.

References

Juncaginaceae